Vincent Briant (born 9 January 1986) is a French former professional footballer who played as a goalkeeper.

Club career
Briant is a product of the FC Nantes training center. In a show on Gol TV called Soccer Academy he was one of two players to sign a professional contract with Nantes after the show followed the everyday lives of the players in the academy. The four favourites to gain the contract were Briant, Dimitri Payet, Fréjus Tchetgna (a defender from Cameroon) and Francisco Donzelot (a midfielder from Columbia). With the departure of Mickaël Landreau from Nantes it was decided that the club would sign Briant as their third string at only 19.

He retired at the age of 25 after the expiration of his contract with CS Sedan Ardennes and became a manager of a store.

References

External links
 
 

1986 births
Living people
Sportspeople from Finistère
French footballers
Association football goalkeepers
FC Nantes players
CS Sedan Ardennes players
Ligue 1 players
Ligue 2 players
Footballers from Brittany
Brittany international footballers